The Consolidated Ice Company Factory No. 2 was built in 1907 in the Lawrenceville neighborhood of Pittsburgh, Pennsylvania. The site includes a two-story office building and an ice manufacturing plant.  The factory was closed in 1951.

The site was listed on the National Register of Historic Places in 2000.

References

Industrial buildings and structures on the National Register of Historic Places in Pennsylvania
Renaissance Revival architecture in Pennsylvania
Romanesque Revival architecture in Pennsylvania
Industrial buildings completed in 1907
Industrial buildings and structures in Pittsburgh
Ice trade
National Register of Historic Places in Pittsburgh
Lawrenceville (Pittsburgh)
1907 establishments in Pennsylvania